Roberto Granados (born 18 August 1970) is a Guatemalan former swimmer who competed in the 1984 Summer Olympics.

References

1970 births
Living people
Guatemalan male swimmers
Guatemalan male freestyle swimmers
Male butterfly swimmers
Olympic swimmers of Guatemala
Swimmers at the 1984 Summer Olympics